Bideford is a small rural settlement, located in the Masterton district in the Wairarapa region of the North Island of New Zealand. The town is located 35 kilometres northeast of Masterton and a similar distance southwest of Eketahuna. Bideford had a primary school until the Wairarapa school merge of 2004.

Name
The settlement is named after Bideford, Devon, and was previously known as Upper Taueru until 1878.

Demographics
Bideford is part of the Whareama statistical area.

Residents
John Falloon, Member of Parliament lived in Bideford at the time of his death.
Jack Williams, Member of Parliament farmed in Bideford

Notes

See also
List of towns in New Zealand
Regions of New Zealand

Populated places in the Wellington Region
Masterton District